The Turkish Futsal League (TFF Efes Pilsen Futsal Ligi) is the premier  futsal competition in  Turkey.
Organized by Turkish Football Federation.

	
The tournament consists of several regional tournaments, the top four teams play the Final Four to determine the champion.

Champions

External links
 www.futsalplanet.com
 Efes Pilsen Futsal League

League
Turkey
Futsal
2008 establishments in Turkey
Sports leagues established in 2008
Professional sports leagues in Turkey